Andrew Stamp (born 2001) is a British trampoline gymnast. Stamp competed at the 2018 Youth Olympics in Buenos Aires where he won a historic silver medal in the boys' individual competition; the first Youth Olympic Games trampoline medal for Great Britain.

References

2001 births
Living people
British male trampolinists
Gymnasts at the 2018 Summer Youth Olympics
21st-century British people